Dan Wédo is a loa of the waters in the form of a great serpent in Vodou.

He is syncretized with the image of St. Louis IX, a king of France (1226-1270) who died of disease while on crusade. St. Louis is usually depicted in armor and crowned.

References

Voodoo gods
Water gods
Snake gods